Smt. Lilavatibai Podar HighSchool, (LPHS), is a co-educational, English medium institution for grades 1 through 12. It is a private, ICSE, unaided, independent, day-boarding school, registered with the state of Maharashtra. LPHS is located in Santacruz (W), Mumbai, India, and is part of the Podar Education Complex.

There are approximately 5000 students in the school (as of 2/22/23).

The school was founded in 1927 by Shri Ganesh Narayan Podar. It has classes from pre-primary up to Std. XII ISC and is affiliated to the Council for the Indian School Certificate Examinations, New Delhi.

History
The Educational Complex was founded under the inspiration of Late Shri Pithashree Anandilal Podar in 1927.
In 1930, Mahatma Gandhi and Mr. Jamnalal Bajaj, owing to their political pre-occupation, retired from the Trusteeship of the Society, and Mr. Madan Mohan Malviya became the President of the Society, till his death in 1946. Thereafter, the Society was guided by Raja Ramdeo Anandilal Podar.

Lilavatibai Podar High School, is a co-educational English medium, unaided institution founded in 1987 by Late Shri Ganesh Narayan Podar. The School claims to impart "sound, liberal education aimed at the development of the total personality of the child".

Format
LPHS offers the standard ICSE curriculum. The campus includes a five-floor main building, the Ramniranjan Podar Hall, and a field equipped with sporting equipment.

Houses and Student Council
The school follows a house system where students are grouped into 4 houses. These are:
 Raman (red) After the scientist Dr. CV Raman
 Swami Vivekanand (yellow)In patronage of the religious and social leader Swami Vivekananda
 Tagore (green)A tribute to the acknowledged author, poet, painter, social reformer, teacher and freedom fighter, Rabindranath Tagore.
 Gandhi (blue)A tribute to the Father of India, Mohandas Karamchand Gandhi.

Interhouse competitions are held regularly. Students are encouraged to showcase their talents. House trophies and individual championship awards are distributed at the annual prize distribution ceremony annually. Interschool competitions, events and social drives are also held. Houses generally have respective house captains and vice-captains.

The Student Council at LPHS generally consists of The ISC Student Council, The ICSE Student Council and House Prefects in lower grades.

The Council is generally elected through a series of rigorous rounds testing their suitability and merit.

References

External links
 School website
 Official website: http://www.lilavatibaipodarschool.com/
 Podar Education Network website http://www.podar.org/

High schools and secondary schools in Mumbai